Janathipathyam (English: Democracy) is a 1997 Indian Malayalam film, directed by K. Madhu and produced by M Mani. The film stars Suresh Gopi, Urvashi, Balachandra Menon and Vani Viswanath in lead roles.

Plot
The movie opens with the communist party winning the state election in Kerala, but the Chief Ministerial candidate has lost the election. The party chief proposes the name of Ramadevan Nayanar aka RD Nayanar, a former Kerala cadre IPS officer, who resigned from the service due to the influence of the villains, including some in the police -IGP Kaimal and DGP Pillai and MP Gopinathan and some other political and business tycoons. RD returns to Kerala from Calcutta and takes over as the Chief Minister, after which he uses his powers to take down his enemies with the help of his wife Indira IAS, and his former colleagues in the police force.

Cast
Suresh Gopi as SSP Ramadeva Nayanar IPS
Former Assistant Commissioner of Police , He later became the Chief Minister of Kerala
Balachandra Menon as Krishnamoorthy IPS 
Former Inspector General
Vani Viswanath as City Police Commissioner Maya Pillai IPS (deceased)
Urvashi as District Collector Indira Menon IAS, wife of RD Nayanar
Aroma Sunilkumar as CI Xavier Idikkula
Maniyanpilla Raju as SI Abootty
Rajan P. Dev as DGP Padmanabhan Pillai IPS
Devan as Vishakom Thirunal Prathapa Varma of Ilyaidathu Kovilakom
Saikumar as K.Gopinathan Menon
Thikkurussi Sukumaran Nair as Valiya Thirumeni of Ilyaidathu Kovilakom
Karamana Janardhanan Nair as Kannan Menon, Party Leader
Shivaji as Thirumulpadu 
KPAC Sunny as Moosakutty K.H 
Poojappura Ravi as Sathyan Nadar, Traffic police officer
TP Madhavan as IG Kaimal IPS
Babu Namboothiri as Bhattathirippadu, Party Secretary
Kozhikode Narayanan Nair as Musaliar
Manju Pillai as Thirumalpadu's wife
Aranmula Ponnamma as Thirumupadu's mother
Bobby Kottarakkara as Cherian Issac, journalist
Appa Haaja as Anantharaman
Elias Babu as Agustine, Ex-Chief Minister of Kerala
Ravi Vallathol as Justice Krishnanunni
Jose Pellissery as Bank Manager Eappachan
Biyon as Kuttan Thampuran of Adoor Kovilakom

References

External links
  
 

1997 films
1990s Malayalam-language films
Fictional portrayals of the Kerala Police
Films shot in Thiruvananthapuram
Films directed by K. Madhu